Golden Beach is a small settlement situated on the Ninety Mile Beach in Gippsland Victoria. The beaches there offer long distances for walking and fishing, but are not patrolled. It has kangaroos on the golf course, a playground near the shops and a lookout deck near the ocean beach. There are many nearby wildlife reserves which are sanctuaries for water birds and other species. Seaspray and Loch Sport are nearby settlements which are slightly more developed with eating places and a caravan park.

Pastoralist William Letts purchased the land from the state government and it become known as Letts' beach. In the late 1940s, a developer changed the name from Letts' Beach to the more appealing Paradise Beach and Golden Beach. In the early 1950s the area was promoted as the "Surfers Paradise of Victoria".
In 2011 the were 330 persons within the twin towns of Golden Beach and Paradise Beach.

In 2020 Wellington Shire Council decided to compulsorily acquire the last 750 undeveloped lots along a "Surfers Paradise of Victoria". Between 1955 and 1969, developers lured thousands of mostly migrants from Melbourne to buy the blocks between Paradise Beach and The Honeysuckles. The subdivision of 11,800 small blocks, should never have been sold off in the first place because most of the land is in flood-prone areas.

References

External links

Coastal towns in Victoria (Australia)
Towns in Victoria (Australia)
Shire of Wellington